Bié is a province of Angola located on the Bié Plateau in central part of country. Its capital is Kuito, which was called Silva Porto until independence from Portugal in 1975. The current governor of Bié is José Amaro Tati.

Geography
Bié has boundaries with the province of Malanje, to the northeast with the province of Lunda Sul, to Moxico, to the south with Cuando Cubango and to the west with the provinces of Huila, Huambo and Cuanza Sul.

Climate
The climate of Bié is cool and abundant rainfall makes it possible to farm maize, sugar cane, rice, coffee and peanuts. Its ground is among the most fertile in Angola.

History
The province was once an important commercial link between the Portuguese traders at the port of Benguela on the Atlantic Ocean and the Ovimbundu in the interior. The capital and other cities in the province remain important commercial centers in Angola.

Origins of Jonas Savimbi

Bié province is perhaps best known as the place where the family of Angolan political leader Jonas Savimbi came from. Savimbi, although born in Moxico Province near Bié, was ethnically Bieno, i.e. of a subgroup of the Ovimbundu. He led the UNITA movement first in the anti-colonial war against the Portuguese, and then in the Civil War against the ruling MPLA before he was killed in combat in 2002.  Savimbi gained global notoriety as a  United States ally during the Cold War.

Civil War

Bié is one of the regions that was heavily affected by the Civil War. Agriculture came to a halt in several areas, and part of the rural population fled to the cities. The province capital Kuito was in part destroyed by bombing, as were roads and other infrastructures. Since 2002, reconstruction efforts have been important, but as of early 2011 much remained to be done.

Municipalities
The province of Bié contains nine municipalities:

 Andulo
 Camacupa
 Catabola
 Chinguar
 Chitembo
 Cuemba
 Cuíto (Kuito)
 Cunhinga
 N'Harea (Nharea)

Communes

The province of Bié contains the following communes; sorted by their respective municipalities:

 Andulo Municipality – Andulo, Calucinga, Cassumbe, Chivaúlo
 Camacupa Municipality – Camacupa, Cuanza, Ringoma, Santo António da Muinha, Umpulo
 Catabola Municipality – Caiuera (Caivera), Catabola Chipeta, Chiuca, Sande
 Chinguar Municipality –  Cangote (Kangote), Chinguar, Cutato (Kutato)
 Chitembo Municipality – Cachingues, Chitembo, Malengue, Mumbué, Mutumbo (Matumbo), Soma Cuanza
 Cuemba Municipality – Cuemba, Luando, Munhango, Sachinemuna
 Kuito Municipality – Cambândua, Chicala, Cuíto (Kuito), Cunje (Kunje), Trumba
 Cunhinga Municipality – Belo Horizonte, Cunhinga
 N'Harea Municipality – Calei (Caiei), Dando, Gamba, Lúbia, N'Harea (Nharea)

List of governors of Bié

References

External links
 Official website of province governor 
 Information on this province at the Angolan ministry for territorial administration
 Information on this province at Info Angola
 US government statistics from 1988
 Province geographical info at geoview.info

 
Provinces of Angola